The Chol Chol River is a river in Chile.  It is situated in the Araucania Region of Chile in the village of Cholchol, just outside Temuco and with the Cautín River are tributaries of the Imperial River (Chile).

The river is a popular destination during the Chilean summer time of January and February when many families from nearby villages travel and camp by the river in order to use it for swimming.

See also

List of rivers of Chile

References 

 EVALUACION DE LOS RECURSOS HIDRICOS SUPERFICIALES EN LA CUENCA DEL RIO BIO BIO

Rivers of Chile
Rivers of Araucanía Region